5-MeO-MPMI (also known as 5-Methoxy-N-methyl-(α,N-trimethylene)tryptamine) is a tryptamine derivative that is a psychedelic drug. It was first developed by the team led by JE Macor in 1992, and subsequently investigated by the team led by David Nichols from Purdue University in the late 1990s. This compound produces psychedelic-appropriate responding in animal tests with a similar potency to the amphetamine-derived psychedelic DOI, and has two enantiomers, with only the (R)-enantiomer being active.

See also
 5-MeO-pyr-T
 5F-MPMI
 4-HO-MPMI
 4-HO-pyr-T
 CP-135,807
 MPMI

References

Psychedelic tryptamines
Designer drugs